The 250t class were high-seas torpedo boats built for the Austro-Hungarian Navy between 1913 and 1916. A total of 27 boats were built by three shipbuilding companies, with the letter after the boat number indicating the manufacturer. There were small variations between manufacturers, mainly in the steam turbines used, and whether they had one or two funnels. The eight boats of the T-group, designated 74 T – 81 T, were built by Stabilimento Tecnico Triestino, located at Trieste. The sixteen boats of the F-group, 82 F – 97 F, were built by Ganz-Danubius at their shipyards at Fiume and Porto Re. The three M-group boats,  98 M – 100 M, were manufactured by Cantiere Navale Triestino at Monfalcone.

All 27 boats saw service in World War I, undertaking anti-submarine operations in the Adriatic Sea, shore bombardment missions along its Italian coastline, and convoy, escort and minesweeping tasks. Although widely used during the war, the class suffered no losses, despite taking hits during surface engagements and damage from accidents. In 1917, one of the  guns on each boat was placed on an anti-aircraft mount. Under the terms of the post-war Treaty of Saint-Germain-en-Laye, the boats were transferred to various countries, including seven to Romania, six to Portugal, six to Greece, and eight to the newly created Kingdom of Serbs, Croats and Slovenes (later Yugoslavia). By 1940, thirteen boats of the class had been lost or scrapped, including all six Portuguese boats.

During World War II, the five remaining Greek boats were sunk by Axis aircraft during the German-led invasion of Greece in April 1941.  One Romanian boat was lost during the war, while the two remaining Romanian boats performed escort tasks in the Black Sea before being taken over by the Soviet Navy, and serving in the Black Sea Fleet until the end of the war; they were finally stricken in late 1945.

The six surviving Yugoslav boats were captured by the Italians during the Axis invasion of Yugoslavia in April 1941, and were operated by the Regia Marina in a coastal and second-line escort role. Immediately following the Italian capitulation in September 1943, one ex-Yugoslav boat was sunk by German aircraft, another was scuttled by its Italian crew, and two more fell back into Yugoslav hands a few months later. The remaining two were seized by the Germans. Of the two ex-Yugoslav boats taken over by the Germans, both were operated by Croatian crews or by the Navy of the Independent State of Croatia for some time before being recovered by the Germans. One was destroyed by Royal Navy Motor Torpedo Boats in June 1944, and the other was sunk by Royal Air Force aircraft in 1945. The two surviving boats were commissioned by the Yugoslav Navy after the war, one continuing in service until the early 1960s.

Background
In 1910, the Austria-Hungary Naval Technical Committee initiated the design and development of a  coastal torpedo boat, specifying that it should be capable of sustaining  for 10 hours. This specification was based on an expectation that in a future conflict, the Strait of Otranto, where the Adriatic Sea meets the Ionian Sea, would be blockaded by hostile forces. In such circumstances, there would be a need for a torpedo boat that could sail from the southern Adriatic Austro-Hungarian Navy base at the Bocche di Cattaro (the modern day Bay of Kotor in Montenegro) to the Strait during darkness, locate and attack blockading ships, and return to port before morning. Steam turbine power was selected for propulsion, as diesels with the necessary power were not available, and the Austro-Hungarian Navy did not have the practical experience to run turbo-electric boats.

Description and construction
Stabilimento Tecnico Triestino (STT) of Trieste was selected for the contract to build eight vessels, ahead of one other tenderer. Despite the specifications of the contract being very close to the requirements for the coastal torpedo boat, the STT boats were classified as sea-going. The STT boats used Parsons turbines driving two propeller shafts. Another tender was requested for four more boats, but when Ganz-Danubius reduced their price by ten percent, a total of sixteen boats were ordered from them. These boats were powered by AEG-Curtiss turbines, and had two funnels rather than the single funnel of the STT boats. The third contract went to Cantiere Navale Triestino (CNT), who used Melms-Pfenniger turbines, and their boats also had two funnels. The boats of all three groups used steam generated by two Yarrow water-tube boilers, one of which burned fuel oil and the other coal.

When completed, all 27 boats were armed with two Škoda  L/30 guns, and four  torpedo tubes. Each vessel could carry 10–12 naval mines.

T-group
The T-group were built by STT at the Port of Trieste between April 1913 and December 1914. The crew consisted of 39 officers and enlisted men.

The T-group boats were originally to be armed with three  L/30 guns, and three  torpedo tubes, but this was changed to two guns and four torpedo tubes before the first boat was completed, to standardise the armament with the following F-group. In 1914, one  machine gun was added.

When 74 Ts turbines were initially installed, the problems with them were so significant that all her power and propulsion machinery had to be rebuilt. She was launched for a second time on 26 June 1914.

F-group
The F-group were built by Ganz & Danubius at Fiume and nearby Porto Re between October 1913 and December 1916. The crew consisted of 38 officers and enlisted men.

When Italy declared war on Austria-Hungary in May 1915, five incomplete F-group boats were towed to be completed in safety. 82 F, 83 F and 84 F were taken from Porto Re to Pola, and 90 F and 91 F were taken to Novigrad. This resulted in delays to the completion of these boats.

M-group
The M-group were built by CNT at Monfalcone between March 1914 and March 1916. The crew consisted of 38 officers and enlisted men.

Service history

World War I
All 27 boats saw service, performing convoy, escort and minesweeping tasks, anti-submarine operations, and shore bombardment missions. They also conducted patrols and supported seaplane raids against the Italian coast. Due to inadequate funding, the 250t class were essentially coastal vessels, despite the original intention that they would be used for "high seas" operations.

1914
At the outbreak of World War I, 74 T – 77 T comprised the 1st Torpedo Group of the 3rd Torpedo Division of the Austro-Hungarian 1st Torpedo Flotilla, which was led by the scout cruiser  commanded by Linienschiffskapitän (Captain) Heinrich Seitz, and supported by the mother ship Gäa. The concept of operation for the 250t-class boats was that they would sail in a flotilla at the rear of a cruising battle formation, and were to intervene in fighting only if the battleships around which the formation was established were disabled, or in order to attack damaged enemy battleships. When a torpedo attack was ordered, it was to be led by a scout cruiser, supported by two destroyers to repel any enemy torpedo boats. A group of four to six torpedo boats would deliver the attack under the direction of the flotilla commander.

In early September 1914, intelligence was received by the Austro-Hungarian command that an Italian volunteer corps were planning to land on the Dalmatian or Istrian coast, and the 1st and 2nd Torpedo Flotillas were involved fruitless patrolling off Sebenico and Zara, and Istria, respectively, between 19 and 24 September. It appears that this was French disinformation intended to keep the Austro-Hungarian fleet engaged while they conducted operations in the southern Adriatic. On the evening of 3 November, the 1st Torpedo Flotilla left Sebenico to make a night torpedo attack on the French fleet, which had begun its seventh raid on the Adriatic on 31 October, but by the time they reached the threatened areas, the French had withdrawn as they were running low on coal.

1915
Italy declared war on Austria-Hungary on the afternoon of 23 May 1915, and almost the entire Austro-Hungarian fleet left Pola soon after to deliver an immediate response against Italian cities and towns along the Adriatic coast, aiming to interdict land and sea transport between southern Italy and the northern regions of that country which were expected to be a theatre of land operations. The fleet split into six groups with a range of targets up and down the coast. Group A included three dreadnought battleships, six pre-dreadnought battleships, and four destroyers, accompanied by 74 T – 77 T and 83 F, fourteen s and six seaplanes, and participated in the Bombardment of Ancona, a shore bombardment operation against the northern Adriatic coast of Italy. The bombardment began at 04:04 on 24 May, and caused significant damage in the shipyard, killing 68, 30 of them military personnel, and wounding 150. The destroyers entered the harbour and launched several torpedoes, sinking one steam ship and damaging two others. Group A withdrew after 05:00 when news was received of Italian submarines leaving Venice en route to Pola. Group E, formed by the light cruiser , a destroyer and 78 T – 81 T, was involved in the shelling of Porto Corsini near Ravenna. In the latter action, an Italian  shore battery returned fire, hitting Novara, killing six and wounding ten, and also damaging 80 T, which had not entered the harbour. 81 T joined Novara in shelling the semaphore station and a lighthouse, and then engaged in the duel with the coastal artillery.

The 250t-class torpedo boats continued to be involved in shore bombardment operations. On 23 July, 77 T and 78 T participated in such a mission led by the scout cruiser  against Ortona on the central Adriatic coast of Italy. Four days later, the scout cruiser , Novara, two destroyers and 75 T, 76 T and 79 T shelled the railway line between Ancona and Pesaro while seaplanes bombed Ancona.

On 28 July, 80 T and 81 T were part of the first major attempt to land on the Italian-occupied island of Pelagosa in the mid-Adriatic. Led by Saida and Helgoland, the six s and two torpedo boats bombarded the island, then landed 108 officers and sailors. The 90-man Italian naval garrison – the size and strength of which had been underestimated by the attacking force – defended bravely, and after two hours the Austro-Hungarian force withdrew, having suffered two killed and ten wounded. Only two Italians were wounded. The 1st Torpedo Flotilla, comprising Saida and Helgoland, five destroyers and five torpedo boats, again attacked Pelagosa on 17 August. 74 T, 77 T and 78 T conducted anti-submarine patrols south of the island along with two destroyers. The bombardment was successful, and managed to destroy defences, a large quantity of supplies, and crucially, the water cistern. This was the final straw for the Italians, who abandoned the island the following day.

In late November 1915, the Austro-Hungarian fleet deployed a force from its main fleet base at Pola to the Bocche; this force included six of the T-group torpedo boats. This force was tasked to maintain a permanent patrol of the Albanian coastline and interdict any troop transports crossing from Italy. A seaplane attack on Ancona on 9 December was supported by 79 T, 85 F and 87 F, accompanying the protected cruiser , two destroyers and two Kaiman-class torpedo boats. Another seaplane attack, this time on Rimini on 14 December, was supported by 83 F, 87 F and 89 F, along with Szigetvár, two destroyers and two Kaiman-class torpedo boats. After an attack on Durazzo in Albania on 30 December in which two Austro-Hungarian destroyers were sunk after straying out of a cleared lane through a minefield, 74 T, 77 T, 78 T, 80 T and 81 T were sent south with Novara, in order to strengthen morale and try to prevent the transfer of the captured crew of one of the destroyers to Italy. No Italian ships were encountered, and the group returned to the Bocche the following day.

1916
This bombardment was conducted as part of the transfer of these ships between Pola and the Bocche, and included an artillery duel between Sankt Georg and an Italian armed train equipped with 4.7 in guns manned by naval personnel. Three days later, Wildfang was south of the Bocche awaiting the return of seaplanes from a mission when the British light cruiser  and the Italian   appeared. Wildfang engaged in a short exchange of fire under the protection of coastal guns and withdrew. In response to the arrival of Liverpool and Pilade Bronzetti, Helgoland, 74 T, 78 T, 80 T, 83 F, 87 F and 88 F sailed, but they were met by another British light cruiser, and the French destroyer , that had relieved Liverpool and Pilade Bronzetti in the intervening period. The Austro-Hungarian torpedo boats, split into two groups, launched torpedo attacks on the new Allied formation, but the only damage was caused by a collision between 74 T and 83 F. The group led by 74 T withdrew to Budua after the collision, but the other group attacked, scoring no hits. Finally, the Austro-Hungarian ships withdrew to the Bocche, having achieved little, and missed opportunities to attack enemy vessels operating further south.

On 22 February, 76 T, 77 T and 83 F, accompanied by a Kaiman-class torpedo boat, laid a minefield outside Antivari harbour. With Austro-Hungarian forces closing on Durazzo from the land, the Allies began to evacuate by sea, and Austro-Hungarian naval forces were sent to attempt to interdict. On 24 February, Helgoland, four destroyers, 77 T, 78 T, 80 T, 83 T, 83 F and 88 F were sent to intercept four Italian destroyers covering the evacuation, but were unable to locate them.

According to the naval historians Enrico Cernuschi and Vincent P. O'Hara, the Austro-Hungarian force retreated behind a minefield with no damage to the torpedo boats, and only splinter damage to the Huszár-class destroyer . However, a more recent work by the naval historian Zvonimir Freivogel disputes the latter assertion, saying that none of the vessels on either side were damaged.

On 24 May, the Allies were anticipating a significant Austro-Hungarian attack from the sea to mark the first anniversary of the Italians entering the war, and a two Allied cruisers and six destroyers were despatched to patrol the area between the Bocche and Brindisi. An Austro-Hungarian force consisting of four destroyers, 75 T, 89 F, 92 F, and 98 M – 100 M was at sea supporting the return of eleven seaplanes that had been sent to attack Padua. Due to fog, only one of the aircraft had been able to identify and drop bombs on a target there, but on the return trip, one of the aircraft mistakenly dropped three bombs on 92 F, luckily missing the target. The same aircraft strafed 100 M with its machine gun. Two torpedo boats from the Italian force,  and  engaged in a  brief exchange of fire with 75 T. During the action, 75 T was hit. Near Fasano, they raided the Otranto Barrage, and Orjen engaged in a gunnery duel with the British drifter Beneficent then sank her with a torpedo, but once the alarm had been raised, the Austro-Hungarian force withdrew. Only one sailor from Beneficent survived.

The Italian destroyer , accompanied by two torpedo boats, entered Parenzo in Istria on 12 June, covered by two groups of destroyers, with the aim of destroying the seaplane base within the harbour. Coastal batteries and guns at the seaplane station opened fire almost immediately, and three seaplanes took off and began attacking the invaders. In the exchange of fire, Zeffiro was damaged and the Italians had to retire, pursued by 93 F, 98 M and 99 M. On 3 July, 83 F, 85 F, 87 F accompanied Helgoland and three destroyers in a fruitless raid on the Otranto Barrage.

On 9 July, Novara led a force which included 87 F and two Kaiman-class torpedo boats in another night raid on the Otranto Barrage which resulted in the sinking of two drifters. The following day, 75 T exchanged fire with four enemy warships. On 31 July, the Italian submarine  stranded on rocks in the Bay of Fiume. The Austro-Hungarians attempted to salvage her, but she sank while under tow. One of the ships involved in her attempted salvage was 50 E, which was unsuccessfully attacked by the Italian submarine  during the operation. On the night of 1/2 August, the Huszár-class destroyers  and Wildfang conducted a shore bombardment of Molfetta on the southern Adriatic coast of Italy, covered by the cruiser , 80 T and 85 F. On the return trip they exchanged fire at extreme range with four Italian destroyers that were trying to intercept them. A further group of Allied vessels led by the Italian protected cruiser  and HMS Liverpool, accompanied by four destroyers and six torpedo boats. The Austro-Hungarian submarine  unsuccessfully engaged Nino Bixio, and the Austro-Hungarian force withdrew before the cruisers closed to gun range.

91 F, 94 F and 98 M were chased and engaged by Italian torpedo boats off Pola on 11 August, resulting in splinter damage to one of the Italian boats. The Austro-Hungarians sent a large force of four cruisers and five destroyers, accompanied by 83 F, 85 F, 87 F and 88 F, to sail off the Italian coast on 28 August, hoping to draw the Allied fleet into a trap formed by four submarines, but fog meant they were not seen, and no engagements resulted. On 15 September, in a first in naval warfare, the submerged French submarine  was sunk by Austro-Hungarian aircraft near the Bocche. The seaplanes landed and captured the entire crew of 27, holding them until 100 M arrived and took them on board. 87 F, 99 M and 100 M conducted a fruitless raid on the Otranto Barrage on the night of 4/5 October. On 4 November, three Italian destroyers and three torpedo boats were involved in a brief encounter in the northern Adriatic with two Austro-Hungarian destroyers accompanied by 83 F, 87 F and 88 F. On the following day, 83 F, 87 F and 88 F conducted a shore bombardment of Sant'Elpidio a Mare.

1917

At the beginning of 1917, the 1st Torpedo Flotilla, consisting of Helgoland, four Tatra-class destroyers and the 250t-class torpedo boats, was based out of the Bocche. During 1917, one of the  guns on each boat was placed on an anti-aircraft mount. On the night of 21/22 April, 84 F, 92 F, 94 F and 100 M conducted a night raid on the Otranto Barrage, sinking the freighter Japigia. On 11 May, the British submarine  stalked 78 T off Pola, firing two torpedoes at her. The British captain had kept his submarine's periscope extended too far and for too long, and the tell-tale "feather" alerted the crew of 78 T, allowing her to avoid the incoming torpedoes. That night, the destroyer Csikós, accompanied by 78 T, 93 F and 96 F, were pursued in the northern Adriatic by an Italian force of five destroyers, but were able to retire to safety behind a minefield.

On 14–15 May 1917, several 250t-class boats were part of the support forces for a major raid on the Otranto Barrage. When the raiding force departed, torpedo boats and aircraft secured the approaches to the Austro-Hungarian naval base at the Bocche. Once the raiding force had departed for the barrage, Sankt Georg, a destroyer, and 84 F, 88 F, 99 M and 100 M were to be prepared to sortie out to support the raiders on their return voyage. The old coastal defence ship  and 86 F, 91 F and 95 F were also available at the Bocche if needed. Although the raid was a relative success, sinking 14 drifters, the raiding force was then engaged by Allied ships in the Battle of the Otranto Straits. Both support groups sailed to meet the returning Austro-Hungarian force, which included the heavily damaged Novara under tow. On marrying-up with the raiding force, the torpedo boats fanned out to screen the larger warships, protecting them as they returned to port. On 21 May 1917, the suffix of all Austro-Hungarian torpedo boats was removed, and thereafter they were referred to only by the numeral. Only two crew members were rescued.

On 3 June, the destroyers Wildfang and Csikós, along with 93 and 96, briefly encountered three Italian MAS boats off the mouth of the Tagliamento river in the far north of the Adriatic. She sank in ten minutes, and 25 of the crew drowned, with 74 rescued. During the July build-up to the Eleventh Battle of the Isonzo, there were several seaplane attacks on the coastal areas of the Italian front in the northern Adriatic which were supported by the Austro-Hungarian fleet. During one of these, an attack on Grado and Cervignano del Friuli by 21 aircraft, cover was provided by 76, 80, 92 and 96 along with three destroyers.

On 23 September, 77 and 78 were laying a minefield off Grado in the northern Adriatic when they had a brief encounter with an Italian MAS boat. The following night, 94, 95 and two other torpedo boats again had a short and inconclusive engagement with Italian torpedo boats in the northern Adriatic. On 29 September, 90, 94, 98 and 99 were accompanying a squadron of four destroyers supporting an air attack on the Italian airfield at Ferrara by flying boats. After destroying an Italian airship, the squadron withdrew at high speed in the darkness, but was intercepted by an Italian squadron of eight destroyers that had been sent from Venice to support an Italian air raid on Pola. In the resultant 45 minute chase towards Parenzo, two Italian destroyers and three Austro-Hungarian destroyers were damaged, and 94 was hit by splinters. As the squadron retreated through the minefields off Parenzo, 98 was also hit by Italian fire, resulting in one casualty.

Two sorties involving boats of the class were conducted on 18 October. In the south, 82, 91, 92 and 94 and five seaplanes acted as scouts for a raid led by Helgoland accompanied by six destroyers, and further north and later in the day, 82, 87, 91, 92, 94 and 95 were part of an escort for a convoy running supplies to Pirano destined for the troops on the Italian Front.

On 14 November, 84, 92, 94, 99 and 100 encountered four Italian destroyers off the mouth of the Piave, but the torpedo boats were again able to elude their pursuers by sailing behind a minefield. Two days later, the coastal defence ships  and Budapest sailed to engage a  Italian shore battery at Cortellazzo near the mouth of the Piave, with an escort that included 84, 92, 94, 98 – 100 and some minesweepers. Both Wien and Budapest were hit, but none of the torpedo boats suffered any damage. After an Italian force of seven destroyers and three MAS boats appeared, the bombarding force withdrew. On 28 November, 250t-class boats were involved in two shore bombardment missions. In the first mission, 79, 86 and 90 supported the bombardment of Senigallia by three destroyers, before they were joined by 78, 82, 87, 89 and 95 and another three destroyers for the bombardment of Porto Corsini, Marotta and Cesenatico. On 19 December, a large Austro-Hungarian force engaged the Italian shore battery at Cortellazzo. The force consisted of the pre-dreadnought , Admiral Spaun, Budapest, six destroyers, ten torpedo boats including 84, 92, 94 and 98 – 100, and ten minesweepers. None of the ships of the bombarding force suffered damage during the mission.

1918
Elements of the Austro-Hungarian fleet mutinied in the Bocche di Cattaro in February 1918, and in May, a plot was discovered to take over 80 at Pola. The motive appeared to be nationalism. Two of the ringleaders, a Czech and a Dalmatian Croat, were tried, convicted and executed by firing squad. On 13 May, the destroyer , 84 and 98 were at Durazzo when two Italian MAS boats forced the harbour, sinking one Austro-Hungarian freighter. On 10 June, 7679, 81 and 87 were part of the escort force that failed to protect the Austro-Hungarian dreadnought  from the Italian MAS boats that sank her. During that action, 76 fired at the Italian boats, but did not score a hit. On 1 July, the destroyers Balaton and Csikós, along with 83 and 88, were chased offshore from Caorle by seven Italian destroyers. All four Austro-Hungarian ships were hit, with 83 hit three times, and 88 struck once. One of the Italian destroyers was hit three times, and another was slightly damaged by splinters. On 6 September, 86 and two other torpedo boats were engaged by three Italian destroyers in the Gulf of Drin. 86 was hit, and the Austro-Hungarian force withdrew. On 2 October, 87 was at Durazzo when the port was bombarded by a multinational Allied naval force. She escaped with minor damage, in what was the last major action involving the Austro-Hungarian Navy.

Post-World War I transfers
Under the provisions of the Treaty of Saint-Germain-en-Laye, all Austro-Hungarian warships were surrendered to the Allies. The 250t-class torpedo boats were distributed among Romania, Portugal, Greece, and the newly created Kingdom of Serbs, Croats and Slovenes (later Yugoslavia), as follows:

World War II

By 1940, thirteen boats of the class had been lost or scrapped, including all six Portuguese boats. At the time of the Axis invasion of Yugoslavia in April 1941, the Yugoslav boats T1 and T3 were assigned to the Southern Sector of Coastal Defence Command based at the Bay of Kotor, along with several minesweepers and other craft. T5–T8 comprised the 3rd Torpedo Division located at Šibenik. On 8 April, the four boats of the 3rd Torpedo Division, along with other vessels, were tasked to support an attack on the Italian enclave of Zara on the Dalmatian coast. They were subjected to three Italian air attacks and, after the last one, sailed from the area of Zaton into Lake Prokljan, where they remained until 11 April. On 12 April, the 3rd Torpedo Division arrived at Milna on the island of Brač, and refused to follow orders to sail to the Bay of Kotor. All six Yugoslav boats were then captured by the Italians.

The five surviving Greek boats were all sunk by aircraft during the German invasion of Greece, also in April 1941. The first was Proussa, which was sunk off Corfu on 4 April by Italian Junkers Ju 87 "Picchiatellos" of the 239th Squadron, 97th Dive Bomber Group. Later, Kios was sunk off Athens on 22 April, Kyzikos at Salamis on 24 April, Pergamos off Salamis on 25 April, and Kydoniai south of the Peloponnese peninsula on the following day, all by German aircraft.

The three Romanian boats were initially deployed against the Soviet Navy Black Sea Fleet following the launch of Operation Barbarossa in June 1941. Năluca took part in the sinking of one Soviet submarine near Mangalia on 9 July 1941, but was herself sunk by Soviet aircraft at Constanța on 20 August 1944. Sborul and Smeul survived World War II, having been transferred to the Soviet Black Sea Fleet in late August 1944 after Romania changed sides and joined the Allies, serving as Musson and Toros respectively.

The Yugoslav boats served in a coastal and second-line escort role with the Royal Italian Navy in the Adriatic under their Yugoslav designations, and were fitted with two  L/30 anti-aircraft guns in place of their 66 mm guns, but no other significant alterations were made to them. After the Italians capitulated in September 1943, they transferred T1 back to the KJRM-in-exile in December of that year. T3 was seized by the Germans at Rijeka on 16 September 1943 and was renamed TA48. She was commissioned on 15 August 1944, and was used for patrol and escort work in the northern Adriatic. The Germans added to her armament, fitting her with two single  anti-aircraft guns in addition to the guns fitted by the Italians, and removing two of her torpedo tubes. There are two versions of how TA48 was employed. The first version indicates that she was crewed exclusively by Croatian officers and sailors, but remained under German control, and the second states that she was handed over to the Navy of the Independent State of Croatia, but was repossessed by the Germans on 14 December 1944 because they considered the Croatians unreliable. Her complement was also increased to 52 during her German-Croatian service. She was sunk in the port of Trieste by Allied aircraft on 20 February 1945.

T5 was also returned to the KJRM-in-exile in December 1943. Once under German control, T7 was also handed over to the Navy of the Independent State of Croatia, and served under her Yugoslav designation. Her crew came under the influence of Yugoslav Partisan propaganda, and were preparing to mutiny when the Germans intervened. On 24 June 1944, she and the S-boats S 154 and S 157 of the 7th S-Boat Flotilla were sailing between Šibenik and Rijeka, protecting German sea supply routes along the Adriatic, when they were attacked by the Royal Navy Fairmile D motor torpedo boats MTB 659, MTB 662 and MTB 670 near the island of Kukuljari, south of Murter Island. The MTBs fired two torpedoes at T7, but missed, so they closed and engaged her with their guns, setting her ablaze. She was beached, and 21 crew were rescued by the MTBs. The British crews later examined the wreck, capturing five more crew, then destroyed her with demolition charges.

Post-World War II
Only four of the twenty-seven 250t-class torpedo boats survived World War II, two in Yugoslav service and two in Soviet service. T1 was commissioned by the Yugoslav Navy after the war as Golešnica. She was re-armed with two  guns on single mounts and four  guns, and her torpedo tubes were removed. She continued in Yugoslav service under that name until October 1959. T5 was also commissioned by the Yugoslav Navy after the war, and renamed Cer. She was fitted with two  guns on single mounts and one  gun, and her torpedo tubes were also removed. She served until 1962, when she was broken up. Musson and Toros were returned to Romania in October 1945, and stricken the following month.

Notes

Footnotes

References

Books

Websites

 
 

Ships built in Trieste
Naval ships of Yugoslavia captured by Germany during World War II
Naval ships of Yugoslavia captured by Italy during World War II
Torpedo boats of the Regia Marina
Torpedo boats of the Royal Yugoslav Navy
Torpedo boats of the Soviet Navy
Torpedo boats of the Kriegsmarine
World War I torpedo boats of Austria-Hungary
World War II torpedo boats of Romania
Ships built in Fiume
Ships built in Croatia